Shadi Sha'aban (sometimes Shaban or Shaaban, ; born March 4, 1992) is an Arab-Israeli—Palestinian footballer who plays for the Palestine national team.

Early life 
Sha'aban was born in Acre, Israel, to an Arab-Israeli family of Palestinian descent.

Internationa career 
Shaban represented Israel at youth level until 2010, before switching allegiance to the senior Palestine national team in 2016.

References

External links
 Profile page in Maccabi Haifa website
 
 Shadi Shaban at Israel Football Association

1992 births
Living people
Palestinian footballers
Palestine international footballers
Israeli footballers
Footballers from Acre, Israel
Association football midfielders
Maccabi Haifa F.C. players
Hapoel Nir Ramat HaSharon F.C. players
Hapoel Bnei Lod F.C. players
Hapoel Acre F.C. players
Ahli Al-Khaleel players
Club Deportivo Palestino footballers
F.C. Daburiyya players
Hapoel Kafr Kanna F.C. players
Israeli Premier League players
Liga Leumit players
2019 AFC Asian Cup players
Expatriate footballers in Chile
Palestinian expatriate sportspeople in Chile
Israeli people of Egyptian descent
Arab-Israeli footballers
Arab citizens of Israel
Israeli people of Palestinian descent
Palestinian people of Israeli descent